Komazawa Olympic Park Stadium (駒沢オリンピック公園総合運動場陸上競技場) is a multi-purpose stadium in Setagaya, Tokyo, Japan. The stadium is an integral feature of Komazawa Olympic Park and is currently used mostly for football matches (although mostly amateur and women's matches) and rugby union games. The stadium has a capacity of 20,010.

The stadium hosted some of the football preliminaries for the 1964 Summer Olympics. Some J. League Division 1, J. League Division 2, J. League Cup, and Emperor's Cup matches, (including the Finals on 1965 and 1966), had also been played at the stadium.

Access
12 minutes walk from Komazawa-daigaku Station (Tōkyū Den-en-toshi Line)

References

1964 Summer Olympics official report. Volume 1. Part 1. pp. 124–5.
Official website
StadiumDB page

Athletics (track and field) venues in Japan
Football venues in Japan
Rugby union stadiums in Japan
Sports venues in Tokyo
Multi-purpose stadiums in Japan
Venues of the 1964 Summer Olympics
Olympic football venues
Buildings and structures in Setagaya
Sports venues completed in 1964
1964 establishments in Japan